A virtual telecine is a piece of video equipment that can play back data files in real time. The colorist-video operator controls the virtual telecine like a normal telecine, although without controls like focus and framing. The data files can be from a Spirit DataCine, motion picture film scanner (like a Cineon), CGI animation computer, or an Acquisition professional video camera. The normal input data file standard is DPX. The output of data files are often used in digital intermediate post-production using a film recorder for film-out. The control room for the virtual telecine is called the color suite.

The 2000 movie O Brother, Where Art Thou? was scanned with Spirit DataCine, color corrected with a VDC-2000 and a Pandora Int. Pogle Color Corrector with MegaDEF. A Kodak Lightning II film recorder was used to output the data back on to film.
 Virtual telecines are also used in film restoration.
Another advantage of a virtual telecine is once the film is on the storage array the frames may be played over and over again without damage or dirt to the film. This would be the case for outputting to different TV standards (NTSC or PAL) or formats: (pan and scan, letterboxed, or other aspect ratio. Restoration, special effect, color grading, and other changes can be applied to the data file frames before playout.

Virtual telecine is like a "tape to tape" color correction process, but with the difference of: higher resolution (2k or 4k) and the use of film restoration tools with standards-aspect ratio tools.

2k virtual DataCine products
First virtual telecine by Philips, now Grass Valley a Thomson SA Brand:
VDC-2000 Virtual DataCine
Specter FS Virtual DataCine

These are able to play out 2k data files in non-linear real time. Size, rotation and color correction-color grading are all able to be done in real time controlled by a telecine color corrector. A Silicon Graphics-SGI computer, an Origin 2000, is used to play the data files to "Spirit DataCine hardware". The Virtual DataCine can output SDTV (NTSC or PAL) and HDTV-high definition or Data files DPX (or TIF), the same as the Datacine. First generation input/output interface for data files as the optical fiber HIPPI cables (up to 6 frame/s at 2k), the next generation interface is GSN-Gigabit Ethernet fibre Optic (up to 30 frame/s at 2k). GSN is also called HIPPI-6400 and was later renamed GSN (for Gigabyte System Network). The SAN hard disk are interfaces to the Virtual DataCine by dual FC-Fibre Channel, cables.
Real time 2k Color Correction is done by a Pandora International's Pogle with a MegaDEF. Input and output 3D LUT-Look up tables are also used to control the look and standard of the clips.

On a Spirit Datacine Phantom TransferEngine software running on an SGI computer or Bones Linux-based software is used to record the DPX files from the Spirit DataCine. These files are stored in the virtual telecine or on a SAN hard disk storage array.
 
The end product was accomplished by playing the DPX files back through the Spirit Datacine's process electronics and a Pandora International's  MegaDef Colour Correction system.

VDC-2000 Specter and Specter FS are made in Weiterstadt-Darmstadt Germany by Grass Valley  - a Thomson SA brand, former names see Philips Broadcast and Robert Bosch GmbH, Fernseh Division.

Real-time virtual telecines
HDTV 4:2:2 and better 4:4:4 RGB can be used as a Virtual Telecine. In this case, standard HDTV video products can be used in a post-production work flow.
As faster computers and SAN-Storage area network came on the market, more Real time 2k Virtual Telecine came on to the market. SDTV is easier to output in real time than HDTV or 2k or 4k display resolution files.
Limitation to speed are: color correction, resizing aspect ratio, dirt removal, special effects, motion picture credits, and other restoration. Also bandwidth speed of the hardware limits real time playout: CPU, interface, SAN, memory, software and hardware.

Some Current virtual telecines are:
Da Vinci Systems Splice
Bones by DFT Digital Film Technology in Weiterstadt, Germany.
Filmlight Baselight
Marquise Technologies MIST prime and MIST i/o
SpectSoft RaveHD and Rave2K
 DFT Flexxity

Non-real-time virtual telecines
A number of products are on the market that can output frames in less than real time. These can be used to output DPX data file, but are too slow for HDTV. For some digital intermediate work 4k data is needed. These large 4k display resolution files cannot be transferred in real time.

See also
Digital cinematography
Telecine
Direct to Disk Recording
Hard disk recorder
Lustre (file system)
Fernseh

External links
A Brief History for Colorists, History of Telecines
Photo of a VDC Specter in three 19 inch rackes
 theasc.com, © 2003 American Cinematographer, DI by Debra Kaufman
American Cinematographer A flex Finish
  Thomson Grassvalley Home Page
 Ascent Media's Virtual Telecine
 - Pogle
 Pandora International Home Page
 Marquise Technologies Home Page
 Grande Vitesse Systems Home Page
theasc.com, © 2003 American Cinematographer, DI by Debra Kaufman
American Cinematographer A flex Finish
kodak.com "Restoration of an impeccably preserved old negative"
Digital Content Producer, NAB 20000: Choose Your Weapons, March 1, 2000, By Dan Ochiva, Michael Goldman, Barry Braverman, Audrey Doyle, Philip De Lancie, Matt Cheplic, and Pete

Film production
Film and video technology
Television technology
Video hardware